Galician, also known as Galego and Gallego, is a Western Ibero-Romance language. Around 2.4 million people have at least some degree of competence in the language, mainly in Galicia, an autonomous community located in northwestern Spain, where it has official status along Spanish. The language is also spoken in some border zones of the neighbouring Spanish regions of Asturias and Castile and León, as well as by Galician migrant communities in the rest of Spain, in Latin America including Puerto Rico, the United States, Switzerland and elsewhere in Europe.

Modern Galician is classified as part of the West Iberian languages group, a family of Romance languages. Galician evolved locally from Vulgar Latin and developed into what modern scholars have called Galician-Portuguese. The earliest document written integrally in the local Galician variety dates back to 1230, although the subjacent Romance permeates most written Latin local charters since the High Middle Ages, being specially noteworthy in personal and place names recorded in those documents, as well as in terms originated in languages other than Latin. The earliest reference to Galician-Portuguese as an international language of culture dates to 1290, in the Regles de Trobar by Catalan author Jofre de Foixà, where it is simply called Galician (gallego).

Dialectal divergences are observable between the northern and southern forms of Galician-Portuguese in 13th-century texts but the two dialects were similar enough to maintain a high level of cultural unity until the middle of the 14th century, producing the medieval Galician-Portuguese lyric. The divergence has continued to this day, most frequently due to innovations in Portuguese, producing the modern languages of Galician and Portuguese.
The lexicon of Galician is predominantly of Latin extraction, although it also contains a moderate number of words of Germanic and Celtic origin, among other substrates and adstrates, having also received, mainly via Spanish, a number of nouns from Andalusian Arabic.

The language is officially regulated in Galicia by the Royal Galician Academy. Other organizations without institutional support, such as the Galician Association of Language and the Galician Academy of the Portuguese Language, include Galician as part of the Portuguese language.

Classification and relation with Portuguese 

Modern Galician and Portuguese originated from a common medieval ancestor designated variously by modern linguists as Galician-Portuguese (or as Medieval Galician, Medieval Portuguese, Old Galician or Old Portuguese). This common ancestral stage developed from Vulgar Latin in the territories of the old Kingdom of Galicia, Galicia and Northern Portugal, as a Western Romance language. In the  century it became a written and cultivated language with two main varieties, but during the  century the standards of these varieties, Galician and Portuguese, began to diverge, as Portuguese became the official language of the independent kingdom of Portugal and its chancellery, while Galician was the language of the scriptoria of the lawyers, noblemen and churchmen of the Kingdom of Galicia, then integrated in the crown of Castile and open to influence from Spanish language, culture, and politics. During the 16th century the Galician language stopped being used in legal documentation, becoming de facto an oral language spoken by the vast majority of the Galicians, but having just some minor written use in lyric, theatre and private letters.

It was not until the  century that linguists elaborated the first Galician dictionaries, and the language did not recover a proper literature until the  century; only since the last quarter of the  century is it taught in schools and used in lawmaking. The first complete translation of the Bible from the original languages dates from 1989. Currently, at the level of rural dialects, Galician forms a dialect continuum with Portuguese in the south, and with Astur-Leonese in the east. Mutual intelligibility (estimated at 85% by Robert A. Hall Jr., 1989) is very high between Galicians and northern Portuguese.

The current linguistic status of Galician with respect to Portuguese is controversial in Galicia, and the issue sometimes carries political overtones. There are linguists who deal with modern Galician and Portuguese as norms or varieties of the same language. Some authors, such as Lindley Cintra, consider that they are still co-dialects of a common language in spite of differences in phonology and vocabulary, while others argue that they have become separate languages due to differences in phonetics and vocabulary usage, and, to a lesser extent, morphology and syntax. Fernández Rei in 1990 stated that the Galician language is, with respect to Portuguese, an ausbau language, a language through elaboration, and not an abstand language, a language through detachment.

With respect to the external and internal perception of this relation, for instance in past editions of the Encyclopædia Britannica, Galician was defined as a Portuguese dialect spoken in northwestern Spain. On the other hand, the director of the Instituto Camões declared in 2019 that Galician and Portuguese were close kin, but different languages. According to the Galician government, universities and main cultural institutions, such as the Galician Language Institute or the Royal Galician Academy, Galician and Portuguese are independent languages that stemmed from medieval Galician-Portuguese, and modern Galician must be considered an independent Romance language belonging to the group of Ibero-Romance languages having strong ties with Portuguese and its northern dialects. The standard orthography has its roots in the writing of relatively modern Rexurdimento authors, who largely adapted Spanish orthography to the then mostly unwritten language. Most Galician speakers do not regard Galician as a variety of Portuguese, but as a different language, which evolved without interruption and in situ from Latin, both languages maintaining separate literary traditions since the 14th century.

Portuguese Early Modern Era grammars and scholars, at least since Duarte Nunes de Leão in 1606, considered Portuguese and Galician two different languages  derived from old Galician, understood as the language spoken in the Northwest before the establishment of the Kingdom of Portugal in the 12th century. The surge of the two languages would be the result of both the elaboration of Portuguese, through the royal court, its internationalization and its study and culture; and of the stagnation of Galician.
The earliest internal attestation of the expression Galician language ("lingoajen galego") dates from the 14th century. In Spanish "lenguaje gallego" is already documented in this same century, circa 1330; in Occitan circa 1290, in the Regles de Trobar by Catalan author Jofre de Foixà: "si tu vols far un cantar en frances, no·s tayn que·y mescles proençal ne cicilia ne gallego ne altre lengatge que sia strayn a aquell" [If you want to compose a song in French, you should not admix Provençal nor Sicilian nor Galician nor other language which is different from it].

Reintegrationism and political implications 
Private cultural associations, not endorsed by Galician or Portuguese governments, such as the Galician Language Association (Associaçom Galega da Língua) and Galician Academy of the Portuguese Language (Academia Galega da Língua Portuguesa), advocates of the minority Reintegrationist movement, support the idea that differences between Galician and Portuguese speech are not enough to justify considering them as separate languages: Galician would be simply one variety of Galician-Portuguese, along with European Portuguese; Brazilian Portuguese; African Portuguese; the Galician-Portuguese still spoken in Spanish Extremadura, Fala; and other dialects. They have adopted slightly-modified or actual Portuguese orthography, which has its roots in medieval Galician-Portuguese poetry as later adapted by the Portuguese Chancellery.

According to Reintegrationists, considering Galician as an independent language reduces contact with Portuguese culture, leaving Galician as a minor language with less capacity to counterbalance the influence of Spanish, the only official language between the 18th century and 1975. On the other hand, viewing Galician as a part of the Lusophony, while not denying its own characteristics (cf. Swiss German), shifts cultural influence from the Spanish domain to the Portuguese. Although it is difficult to clarify the political positions of those who favor one view or the other, Reintegrationism is usually associated with the more radical spectrum of Galician independentism. Some scholars have described the situation as properly a continuum, from the Galician variants of Portuguese in one extreme to the Spanish language in the other (which would represent the complete linguistic shift from Galician to Spanish); reintegrationist points of view are closer to the Portuguese extreme, and so-called isolationist ones would be closer to the Spanish one; however, the major Galician nationalist parties, Anova–Nationalist Brotherhood and Galician Nationalist Bloc, do not use reintegrationist orthographical conventions.

Official relations between Galicia and the Lusophony 
In 2014, the parliament of Galicia unanimously approved Law 1/2014 regarding the promotion of the Portuguese language and links with the Lusophony. Similarly, on 20 October 2016, the city of Santiago de Compostela, the capital of Galicia, approved by unanimity a proposal to become an observer member of the Union of Portuguese-Speaking Capitals (UCCLA). Also, on 1 November 2016, the Council of Galician Culture (Consello da Cultura Galega, an official institution of defence and promotion of the Galician culture and language) was admitted as a consultative observer of the Community of Portuguese Speaking Countries (CPLP).

A "friendship and cooperation" protocol was signed between the Royal Galician Academy (RAG) and the Brazilian Academy of Letters on 10 January 2019. Víctor F. Freixanes, president of the RAG, stated during the ceremony that "there is a conscience that the Galician language is part of a family which includes our brothers from Portugal, Brasil, Angola, Cape Verde, Mozambique... a territory full of possibilities also for Galician. We always said that Galician is not a regional language, but is in fact part of that international project".

Geographic distribution and legal status 
Galician is spoken by some three million people, including most of the population of Galicia and the numerous Galician communities established elsewhere, in Spain (Madrid, Barcelona, Biscay), in other European cities (Andorra la Vella, Geneva, London, Paris), and in the Americas (New York, New Jersey, Buenos Aires, Córdoba/Argentina, Montevideo, Mexico City, Havana, Caracas, San Juan in Puerto Rico, São Paulo, Managua, Mayagüez, Ponce, Panama City).

Galician is today official, together with the Spanish language, in the autonomous community of Galicia, where it is recognized as the autochthonous language (lingua propia), being by law the first language of the local administrations and governments. It is supposed by law to be taught bilingually, alongside Spanish, in both primary and secondary education, although the accomplishment of this law is allegedly doubted. It is also used at the three universities established in Galicia, having also the consideration of official language of the three institutions. Galician has also legal recognition in the Bierzo region in León, and in four municipalities in Zamora. The other languages with official status elsewhere in Spain are Spanish, Catalan (or Valencian), Basque and Aranese. Galician has also been accepted orally as Portuguese in the European Parliament, being used by some Galician representatives, among others: José Posada, Camilo Nogueira and Xosé Manuel Beiras.

Controversy exists regarding the inclusion of Eonavian (spoken in the western end of Asturias, bordering Galicia) into the Galician language, as it has some traits in common with Western Asturian (spoken in the middle west of Asturias). There are those defending these linguistic varieties as dialects of transition to the Astur-Leonese group on the one hand, and those defending it as clearly Galician varieties on the other (actually both views are compatible). The recent edition of the cartularies of Oscos in Old Common Council of Castropol and cartularies of Obona, Cornellana, Corias and Belmonte in middle west of Asturias have shown a huge difference in the medieval speech between both banks of the Navia river. An examination of the old documents of the Eonavian monastery of Oscos, written from the late 12th to early 14th century to 16th century, shows a clear identification of this language with the Galician-Portuguese linguistic group; while contemporary parchments elsewhere in Asturias are written in Spanish.

History 

Latinate Galician charters from the  century onward show that the local written Latin was heavily influenced by local spoken Romance, yet is not until the  century that there is evidence for the identification of the local language as a language different from Latin itself. During this same  century there are full Galician sentences being inadvertently used inside Latin texts, while its first reckoned use as a literary language dates to the last years of this same century.

The oldest known document is the poem Ora faz ost'o Senhor de Navarra by Joam Soares de Paiva, written around 1200. The first non-literary documents in Galician-Portuguese date from the early  century, the Noticia de Torto (1211) and the Testamento of Afonso II of Portugal (1214), both samples of medieval notarial prose.

Its most notable patrons—themselves reputed authors—were king Dom Dinis in Portugal, and king Alfonso X the Learned in Galicia, Castile and León, who was a great promoter of both Galician and Castilian Spanish languages.

Aside from the lyric genres, Galicia developed also a minor tradition on literary prose, most notably in translation of European popular series, as those dealing with King Arthur written by Chretien de Troyes, or those based on the war of Troy, usually paid and commissioned by noblemen who desired to read those romances in their own language. Other genres include history books (either translation of Spanish ones, or original creations like the Chronicle of St. Mary of Iria, by Rui Vasques), religious books, legal studies, and a treaty on horse breeding. Most prose literary creation in Galician had stopped by the  century, when printing press became popular; the first complete translation of the Bible was not printed until the  century.

Diglossia and influence of the Spanish language 

Galician-Portuguese lost its political unity when the County of Portugal obtained its independence from the Kingdom of León, a transition initiated in 1139 and completed in 1179, establishing the Kingdom of Portugal. Meanwhile, the Kingdom of Galicia was united with the Kingdom of León, and later with the Kingdom of Castile, under kings of the House of Burgundy. The Galician and Portuguese standards of the language diverged over time, following independent evolutionary paths. Portuguese was the official language of the Portuguese chancellery, while Galician was the usual language not only of troubadours and peasants, but also of local noblemen and clergy, and of their officials, so forging and maintaining two slightly different standards.

During the reign of Alfonso X, Spanish became the official language of the chancellery of the Kingdom of Castile. However, in Galicia and neighboring regions of Asturias and León in 1200–1500, the local languages remained the usual written languages in any type of document, either legal or narrative, public or private. Spanish was progressively introduced through Royal decrees and the edicts of foreign churchmen and officials. This led, from the late 15th century on, to the end of legal documents in Galician; the last ones were issued around 1530. Also, from 1480 on, notaries of the Crown of Castile were required to obtain their licenses in Toledo, where they had to prove their mastery of Spanish.

In spite of Galician being the most spoken language, during the 17th century the elites of the Kingdom began speaking Spanish, most notably in towns and cities. The linguistic situation in Galicia became one of diglossia, with Galician as the low variety and Spanish as the high one. In reaction to the relegation of the autochthonous language, a series of literary and historical works (always written in Spanish) appeared in the 17th century through 19th century, meant to vindicate the history, language, people, and culture of Galicia. The period from the 16th century to the early 19th century, when Galician had little literary—and no legal—use, is considered the dark age of Galician language. The Galician spoken and written then is usually referred to as Middle Galician.

Middle Galician 

Middle Galician is known mostly through popular literature (songs, carols, proverbs, theatrical scripts, personal letters), but also through the frequent apparition of Galician interferences and personal and place names in local works and documents otherwise written in Spanish. Other important sources are a number of sonnets and other lyric poetry, as well as other literate productions, including the forgery of allegedly mediaeval scriptures or chronicles under diverse pretensions—usually to show the ancient nobility of the forger's family—being these writings elaborated in an archaic looking Galician which nevertheless could not conceal the state of the language during this period.

The most important author during this period of the language was the enlightened scholar Martín Sarmiento, unconditional defender and the first researcher of Galician language (history, evolution, lexicon, etymology, onomastics). His Elementos etimológicos segun el método de Euclides (1766), written in Spanish but dealing with Galician, was in fact one of the first comprehensive studies on sound change and evolution of any European language.

Rexurdimento (Renaissance) 

During the 19th century a thriving literature developed, in what was called the Rexurdimento (Resurgence), of the Galician language. It was headed by three main authors: Rosalia de Castro, an intimist poet; Eduardo Pondal, of nationalist ideology, who championed a Celtic revival; and Manuel Curros Enríquez, a liberal and anticlerical author whose ideas and proclamations were scandalous for part of the 19th-century society.

An important landmark was the establishment of the Seminario de Estudos Galegos in 1923, devoted to research and study of Galician culture. It was created by a group of students: Fermín Bouza Brey, Xosé Filgueira Valverde, Lois Tobío Fernández, with the collaboration of Ricardo Carvalho Calero, Antón Fraguas and Xaquín Lorenzo Fernández.

Following the victory of Francisco Franco in the Spanish Civil War, the written or public use of the Galician language was outlawed.

Publishing of Galician-language material revived on a small scale in the 1950s.

The Galician language today 
With the advent of democracy, Galician has been brought into the country's institutions, and it is now co-official with Spanish in Galicia. Galician is taught in schools, and there is a public Galician-language television channel, Televisión de Galicia.

Today, the most common language for everyday use in the largest cities of Galicia is Spanish rather than Galician, as a result of this long process of language shift. However, Galician is still the main language in rural areas.

The Royal Galician Academy and other Galician institutions celebrate each 17 May as Galician Literature Day, dedicated each year to a deceased Galician-language writer chosen by the academy.

Use of the Galician language 
Use of Galician splits by age, with over half of those over 45 indicating that Galician is their primary language, with lower numbers for the younger population. Those under 45 were more likely than those over 45 to answer that they never use Galician.

Use of Galician also varies greatly depending on the regions and municipalities of Galicia. While in two areas of the Province of A Coruña (Costa da Morte and the Southeast) more than 90% of the population always or mostly speaks in Galician, only the 15,2% of the population does the same in the city of Vigo.

Dialects 
Some authors are of the opinion that Galician possesses no real dialects. Despite this, Galician local varieties are collected in three main dialectal blocks, each block comprising a series of areas, being local linguistic varieties that are all mutually intelligible. Some of the main features which distinguish the three blocks are:
 The resolution of medieval nasalized vowels and hiatus: these sometimes turned into diphthongs in the east, while in the center and west the vowels in the hiatus were sometimes assimilated. Later, in the eastern—except Ancarese Galician—and central blocks, the nasal trait was lost, while in the west the nasal trait usually developed into an implosive nasal consonant . In general, these led to important dialectal variability in the inflection in genre and number of words ended in a nasal consonant.
 An exception to this rule is constituted by the hiatus in which the first vowel was a nasalized i or u. In those cases, a nasal, palatal  or velar  was usually inserted: ũa 'a / one (fem.)' > unha (Portuguese uma), -ina > -ĩa > -iña (Portuguese -inha). Nevertheless, in Ancarese and Asturian Galician, this process did not take place: A-G vecía, Ancarese vecĩa vs. standard veciña '(female) neighbor' (Port. vizinha), A-G úa, Ancarese ũa vs. standard unha (Port. uma).
So, Medieval Galician  'animals' (sing. animal); central and western Galician animás; eastern Galician animais; Asturian Galician animales ( is preserved).
 In the west,  is rendered as a fricative  (gheada), except after a nasal, where it can become a stop .
 Stressed vowel metaphony is most notable in the west and center, while in the east it is unknown. It is triggered by a final , which tends to close open-mid vowels, or by a final  which tends to open close-mid ones.
 There are three main sibilant systems, all derived from the medieval Galician one, which was richer and more complex:
 The common one, extended in the eastern and center regions, presents an opposition .
Sometimes this system is even further reduced to just a single .

Each dialectal area is then further defined by these and other more restricted traits or isoglosses:
Eastern Galician: Asturian area (Eonavian), Ancares area, Zamora area and Central-Eastern area.
Central Galician: Mindoniense area, Lucu-auriense area, Central Transitional area, and Eastern Transitional area.
Western Galician: Bergantiños area, Fisterra area, Pontevedra area and Lower Limia area.
Standard Galician is usually based on Central Galician characteristics, but it also incorporates western and eastern traits and features.

Examples 

 Bold type indicate official standard spelling. On the phonemic representation.
  Metaphony produced by final  and by final  (usually produced ). All the diverse productions are considered admissible. In the east there's little to no metaphony.
  Different evolution of the group  led to different desinences for the past tense formation along Galician geography.

Phonology

Grammar 
Galician allows pronominal clitics to be attached to indicative and subjunctive forms, as does Portuguese, unlike modern Spanish. After many centuries of close contact between the two languages, Galician has also adopted many loan words from Spanish, and some calques of Spanish syntax.

Galician usually makes the difference according to gender and categorizes words as masculine "o rapaz" (the young man) or feminine "a rapaza" (the young woman). This difference is present in the articles "o / a / os / as" (the), nouns "o can / a cadela" (the dog / the (female) dog), pronouns "el / ela", (he / she) and adjectives "bonitiño / bonitiña" (pretty, beautiful). There is also a neuter set of demonstrative pronouns "isto, iso, aquilo" (this / that). The most typical ending for masculine words is -o, whereas the most typical ending for feminine is -a "o prato / a tixola" (the plate / the frying pan). The difference in the grammatical gender of a word may correspond to a real gender difference in the physical world "xuicioso / xuiciosa" (sensible); the former adjective will qualify a male, and the latter, a female. However, there is no particular reason for objects to be ascribed to a particular grammatical gender or another, it has to do with the gender having been ascribed by tradition and the use of speakers as in the following examples: "o xis / o samba / a mesa / a caricatura" (chalk / the samba / the table / the caricature).

Galician expresses the difference in number with a form for the singular and another for the plural. The most typical suffix to express a plural number is "s", "cantiga / cantigas".

There are two different ways of addressing people: one is the most usual informal pronoun "ti" for the second person singular and "vos" for the second person plural. There are formal ways of addressing directly people "vostede" for the singular and "vostedes" for the plural.

The last review of the official grammar has established that, if there is no risk of confusion, the exclamation and question marks will appear only at the end of the sentence, thus deprecating the general use of Spanish-like inverted question and exclamation marks.

The verb is inflected. There are regular and irregular verbs in the language. All verbs will appear listed by means of their infinitive form in dictionaries, and there are three typical endings for verbs "-ar / -er / -ir".

Orthography  

The current official Galician orthography is guided by the "Normas ortográficas e morfolóxicas do Idioma Galego" (NOMIGa), first introduced in 1982, by the Royal Galician Academy (RAG), based on a report by the Instituto da Lingua Galega (ILG). These norms were not accepted by some sectors desiring a norm closer to modern Portuguese (see reintegrationism). In July 2003, the Royal Galician Academy modified the language normative to admit and promote some archaic Galician-Portuguese forms conserved in modern Portuguese, merging the NOMIG and the main proposals of the moderate sectors of reintegrationism; the resulting orthography is used by the vast majority of media, cultural production and virtually all official matters including education.

There still exists a reintegrationist movement that opts for the use of writing systems that range from adapted to whole Portuguese orthography.

Acute accent 
Syllabic stress is significant in Galician. One syllable in each word receives primary stress. The syllable receiving the primary stress can generally be identified by the spelling of the word according to the language's rules of orthography. In cases where the stress is not at the default location indicated by the spelling, an acute accent (´) is placed over the main vowel of the stressed syllable, as in paspallás ('quail'), móbil ('mobile'), and cárcere ('jail', 'gaol').

The acute accent has some other functions. Sometimes it shows that adjacent vowels represent separate syllables rather than a diphthong, as in aínda ('yet'). Acute accents are written on top of upper- as well as lower-case letters: Óscar. An acute accent may also be used to distinguish between two words that are otherwise homonyms, as in the case of cómpre ('it is necessary') and compre ('to buy').

Examples

See also 
 Barallete
 Castrapo
 Fala dos arxiñas, a jargon of Galician masons
 Galician-language literature
 Galicia irredenta
 Languages of Spain
 Leonese language
 List of Galician words of Celtic origin

Notes

References

Bibliography

Further reading 
  Examines the arguments for and against the use of inclusive language in (literary) translation through an analysis of the "ideological struggle" that emerged from two ideologically disparate rewritings of gender markers into Galician of The Curious Incident of the Dog in the Night-Time, by Mark Haddon (2003), focusing on the ideological, poetic and economic pressures that (still) define the professional practice of translation.

External links

Galician guides:
 lingua.gal – Galician government's portal on the Galician language
 LOIA: Open guide to Galician Language
 Basic information on Galician language 

Records, phonetic and dialectology:
 Arquivo do Galego Oral – An archive of records of Galician speakers.
 A Nosa Fala – Sound recordings of the different dialects of the Galician language.
 Amostra comparativa – Comparison between Galician, Portuguese and Brazilian-Portuguese pronunciation (with sound files) (reintegrationist Galician)

Corpora:
 Tesouro medieval informatizado da lingua galega. 
 Corpus Xelmirez – A corpus on medieval Galician documentation, in Galician, Latin, and Spanish.
 Tesouro informatizado da lingua galega. 

Dictionaries:
 Royal Galician Academy Dictionary  
 Appendix:Galician pronouns – on Wiktionary
 English-Galician CLUVI Online Dictionary (official Galician)
 Galician – English Dictionary: from Webster's Online Dictionary – The Rosetta Edition. (Official Galician), 
 A short English-Galician-Japanese Phraselist (Renewal) incl. sound soft (Official Galician), 
 Dicionario de dicionarios do galego medieval – A dictionary of Old Galician dictionaries. 
 Dicionario de dicionarios – A dictionary of Galician dictionaries. 
 e-Estraviz – Isaac Alonso Estraviz's dictionary (on-line). (reintegrationist norm and official norm)

Texts:
 Gallaeciae Monumenta Historica – An on-line repository of medieval texts 
 Cantigas Medievais Galego-Portuguesas – A complete DB, containing the totality of the medieval profane lyric. 
 Biblioteca Virtual Galega 
 Cantigas de Santa Maria

Newspapers in Galician:
 Luns a Venres – free daily newspaper 
 Sermos Galiza  – weekly newspaper and online news portal 
 Galiciaé.es – online news portal 
 Praza Pública – online news portal 
 Diário Liberdade – online news portal (in reintegrationist Galician)
 Novas da Galiza – monthly newspaper (in reintegrationist Galician)
 Galiza Livre – pro-independence online news portal (in reintegrationist Galician)

Other links related to Galician:
 Royal Galician Academy  
 Instituto da Lingua Galega 
 Academia Galega da Língua Portuguesa (reintegrationist Galician)
 Associaçom Galega da Língua – Portal Galego da Língua (reintegrationist Galician)
 Movimento Defesa da Lingua (reintegrationist Galician)